This article displays the rosters for the participating teams at the 2012 FIBA Africa Club Championship.

Abidjan Basket Club

Al Ahly

Al-Ittihad Alexandria

ASB Mazembe

Étoile Sportive du Sahel

Espoir Kigali

Kano Pillars

Manga BB

Mongomo BC

Petro Atlético

Primeiro de Agosto

Recreativo do Libolo

References

External links
 2012 FIBA Africa Champions Cup Participating Teams

FIBA Africa Clubs Champions Cup squads
Basketball teams in Africa
FIBA